Snong Chiayong (born 12 February 1933) is a Thai former footballer who competed in the 1956 Summer Olympics and in the 1968 Summer Olympics.

References

External links
 

1933 births
Living people
Snong Chiayong
Snong Chiayong
Footballers at the 1956 Summer Olympics
Footballers at the 1968 Summer Olympics
Southeast Asian Games medalists in football
Snong Chiayong
Association football midfielders
Competitors at the 1959 Southeast Asian Peninsular Games
Snong Chiayong